Who Killed Aunt Maggie? is a 1940 American mystery film directed by Arthur Lubin and starring John Hubbard, Wendy Barrie and Mona Barrie. It was produced and distributed by Republic Pictures.

Plot
Radio-mystery script writer Sally Ambler is about to be married but quarrels with her fiancé Kirk Pierce after he finds a story that she wrote to be too contrived. The wedding is postponed when a telegram arrives from Sally's aunt Maggie in Atlanta informing Sally that her uncle Charlie has died.

Sally is followed to Atlanta after a phone call from Dr. Benedict warns Kirk of danger lurking for Sally when she arrives there. Sally discovers that her uncle's corpse is missing and that he may have been murdered. Sally is the sole heir after Aunt Maggie is strangled, and her cousin Eve ends up dead as well after finding a secret room.

Dr. Benedict is revealed to have been behind the plot. After he is apprehended just in time, Sally and Kirk return home but argue again during their wedding ceremony over which kind of mystery plot is too unbelievable.

Cast
 John Hubbard as Kirk Pierce
 Wendy Barrie as Sally Ambler
 Mona Barrie as Eve Benedict
 Joyce Compton as Cynthia Lou
 Walter Abel as Dr. Benedict
 Onslow Stevens as Dunbar
 Elizabeth Patterson as Maggie
 Edgar Kennedy as Sheriff

Production
The film was based on a bestselling 1939 novel by Medora Field, a writer for the Atlanta Journal Magazine. Field's close friend Margaret Mitchell encouraged her to write the book after Field had urged Mitchell to submit her manuscript for Gone with the Wind to Macmillan in 1935.

Republic Pictures bought the film rights in 1940. Stewart Palmer was assigned to write the script in June 1940. The studio briefly considered renaming the film Belle of Atlanta before settling on the book's original title. The cast and crew were set by late August, with John Hubbard borrowed from Hal Roach. Filming was completed by September.

Reception
The Los Angeles Times called the film "one of those good, old time mystery thrillers."

References

External links
Who Killed Aunt Maggie? at IMDb
Who Killed Aunt Maggie? at TCMDB
Who Killed Aunt Maggie? at BFI
Review of film at Variety

1940 films
1940 mystery films
Films directed by Arthur Lubin
American mystery films
American black-and-white films
1940s English-language films
1940s American films